WZZW (1600 AM) is a Christian preaching oriented radio station licensed to serve the community of Milton, West Virginia, as part of the Huntington radio market.

The station was assigned the WZZW call letters by the Federal Communications Commission on February 1, 1995.

On February 19, 2021, WZZW is being donated to Pure Media Ministries from the trust and will join the "Pure Radio" network after closing.

On April 16, 2021, Aloha Station Trust has closed on a sale for WZZW to Pure Media Ministries. It has since flipped to Pure Radio.

References

External links

ZZW
News and talk radio stations in the United States
Cabell County, West Virginia
Radio stations established in 1975